James or Jim Tunney may refer to:

James Tunney (Irish politician) (1892–1964), Irish Labour Party politician
Jim Tunney (Irish politician) (1923–2002), Irish Fianna Fáil politician, son of the above
James Tunney (Canadian politician) (1927–2010), former Canadian senator
Jim Tunney (American football) (born 1929), American football official
 Gene Tunney (James Joseph Tunneym, 1897–1978), American boxer